Vivian Martin Prince (born 9 August 1941) is an English drummer. He played in a variety of bands during the 1960s, including Pretty Things. He was noted for his wild and eccentric behaviour, which garnered a lot of publicity for the group and influenced Keith Moon.

Biography 

Viv Prince was born in Loughborough. His father, Harry Prince, played in a local jazz band. Viv's first instrument was guitar, but then he switched to drums. After leaving school, he worked briefly as a tax officer, playing with local jazz bands, including his father's, as a hobby.

Viv Pince's first professional work as a musician was with the traditional jazz band Lennie Baldwin's Dauphin Street Six in 1961, with whom he toured in Denmark and made his first recordings in 1962. He left them during a tour in Germany to join the Jazz Cardinals. Without a work permit, he soon had to return to London, to make a name for himself as a session musician, contributing to many pop records of the era. He joined Carter-Lewis and the Southerners in June 1963, with whom he recorded three singles, including the hit "Your Momma's Out of Town", alongside Jimmy Page. Around this time he became the first British rock musician against whom a drug-related charge was brought up in the court. As a skilled professional with an extrovert, unorthodox drumming style and considerable entertainment value, Viv Prince was repeatedly approached by the young British rock bands - such as the Kinks - to become their drummer. In 1964 he was persuaded by Pretty Things management to join the band, thus completing its first most iconic and legendary lineup, and played the drums on their first two albums, The Pretty Things and Get the Picture?, both released in 1965.

The Pretty Things often made the headlines for their wild antics, which were due in no small part to Prince. Often inebriated or high on amphetamines, he would leave his drum stool to roam around the stage, and generally cause havoc wherever he went. A young Keith Moon attended several Pretty Things concerts to study Prince's style (according to Jimmy Page, Prince was also the one to coin the nickname "Moon the Loon" for Keith - with whom, as well as with Brian Jones, Dave Davies, John Entwistle, P.J. Proby and the Beatles he was on friendly terms). The mayhem culminated in a tour of New Zealand in August 1965, during which he paraded around in a leopard-skin pillbox hat, carrying around a dead crayfish on a string, plotting pranks and setting fires onstage, which resulted in big amount of bad publicity. Following an altercation with the crew, he was thrown off the plane that was taking the band home after the tour and had to make his own way back to England. Over time, he would miss recording sessions more and more often, and the band had to call upon other drummers to replace him, including Bobby Graham, Mitch Mitchell and Twink. His tenure with the Pretty Things ended in mid-November 1965, when the band sacked him due to his growing unreliability. He was replaced by Skip Alan.

After leaving the Pretty Things, Prince played with the Bunch of Fives and the Denny Laine String Band. He also deputised on drums during concerts for the Honeycombs, the Who, and Hawkwind, and was considered to become a drummer for the Jeff Beck Group. For some time he ran the Knuckles club in Soho, London, that, as he claimed, served as the first rehearsal base for Jimi Hendrix in England; Prince also claimed to suggest the musicians to complete the lineup of the Jimi Hendrix Experience. During the second half of the 1960s, he contributed to LPs by Chris Barber (at the session led by Paul McCartney), Twink and McGough & McGear (also joined by Jimi Hendrix), as well as released a few singles as a member of the bands such as VAMP (with Pete Sears and members of Hutchinson Clark), Kate, and a solo single, Light of the Charge Brigade.

Viv Prince was also reported to be involved in the election campaign activity for Screaming Lord Sutch's Monster Raving Looney Party, as well as to be expelled from the members of Hell's Angels for bad behaviour. He also underwent a few trial cases and a survived a fire in his house.

During the 1980s, Prince returned to Loughborough for a while, playing with local soul band Sugar Shack. As of 2005, he was living near Faro, Portugal. The Pretty Things wrote and recorded "Vivian Prince," a song in homage to him, on their album ... Rage Before Beauty, released in 1999.

Discography 
 1965: Pretty Things – The Pretty Things
 1965: Pretty Things – Get the Picture?
 1966: Viv Prince – Light of the Charge Brigade / Minuet for Ringo
 1966: Chicago Line – Shimmy Shimmy Ko Ko Bop / Jump Back
 1966: The Bunch of Fives – I Go Home Baby / At the Station
 1968: Vamp – Floatin' / Thinkin' Too Much
 1969: Vamp – Green Pea / Wake Up and Tell Me
 1969: Kate – Shout It / Sweet Little Thing

Notes 

In 1989-1990. Vince was working in the pot wash at a hotel in Sidmouth, Devon. I got to know him there. Nice man, but drinking ruined him.
 Still wondering if he is still alive.

Sources
 

1941 births
Living people
People from Loughborough
English rock drummers
Pretty Things members
The Jeff Beck Group members